Kublai Khan, founder of the Yuan dynasty, led several campaigns during the Mongol invasions and conquests. These included the Mongol invasions of Japan, First Mongol invasion of Burma, Mongol invasion of Java, second and third Mongol invasions of Vietnam, and Mongol invasion of Champa.

Campaigns against Song dynasty 

The campaign for Kublai Khan to conquer southern China under the Southern Song dynasty were specified under the years between 1266 and 1276. This included the declaration of Kublai Khan as the new emperor of China in the year 1271 This was the start of the Yuan dynasty that was a rule incorporated with elements of both Han and Mongol influences. After successfully eliminating all resistance to the new Yuan dynasty, Kublai Khan wanted to expand his empire by attacking Japan and built around 300-600 vessels in preparation for the assault on Japan.

Campaign against Korea

Campaigns against Japan 

Kublai Khan's armada in 1274 made a tactical mistake by sailing into open seas that became targets for the Japanese cannons. Suffering heavy losses, the remaining fleet retreated and prepared for next assault again on 1281. Again on 1281, the Japanese samurais were more than prepared to hold off an invasion attempt by the Kublai Khan's fleet, and which they did so with great success. Even though the campaign failed in the end due to stiff Japanese resistance, Kublai Khan's campaigns saw the development of gunpowder as a form of weaponry.

Campaigns against Burma, Java and Vietnam 

Besides the Song dynasty and Japan, Kublai Khan also launched campaigns against Burma, Java and Vietnam. A series of military conflicts between the Yuan dynasty and the Pagan Empire took place between 1277 and 1287, collectively known as the First Mongol invasion of Burma. The invasion toppled the 250-year-old Pagan Empire and the Yuan dynasty annexed Upper Burma. However, Yuan invasions of both Java and Vietnam resulted in failure. Nevertheless, both the Trần dynasty (Đại Việt) and Champa decided to accept the nominal supremacy of the Yuan dynasty in order to avoid further conflicts.

References

13th century in China
13th century in Japan
13th-century conflicts
Invasions of China
Invasions of Japan
Invasions of Myanmar
Invasions of Vietnam
Military campaigns involving China
Wars involving Imperial China
Wars involving Japan
Wars involving Myanmar
Wars involving Vietnam
Song dynasty
Wars involving the Yuan dynasty
History of Java
Invasions by the Mongol Empire
Kublai Khan